Cochliobolus spicifer is a fungal plant pathogen.

External links 
 Index Fungorum
 USDA ARS Fungal Database

Fungal plant pathogens and diseases
Cochliobolus
Fungi described in 1964